Gaius Servilius Geminus (died 180 BC) was a Roman statesman who served as Consul in 203 BC, Dictator in 202 BC (the last in 120 years), and Pontifex Maximus from 183 BC to 180 BC.

Heritage
Geminus was the son of Gaius Servilius Geminus, a Roman magistrate. He was a member of gens Servilia, a patrician family.

Early career
In 212 BC Geminus was sent to Etruria to buy grain for the troops of the Roman garrison in Tarentum, then besieged by Hannibal. He successfully penetrated into the city and delivered supplies. In 210 BC he was elected Pontifex in place of Titus Otacilius Crassus and in 209 BC was chosen as Aedile. He was selected to serve as magister equitum, while exercising his position as Aedile, under dictator Titus Manlius Torquatus. In 206 BC he became praetor and obtained Sicily as a province.

Consulship and later career 
Geminus was elected consul, alongside Gnaeus Servilius Caepio, in 203 BC, and obtained Etruria as a province. From there he went to Cisalpine Gaul where his father of the same name was held as a prisoner of war since 218 BC. In 202 BC Geminus was named Dictator by his brother Marcus Servilius Pulex Geminus to hold elections. He was the last person to hold that position until Lucius Cornelius Sulla in 82 or 81 BC. In 201 BC he served as one of Decemviri responsible for the distribution of land among veterans who fought with Scipio Africanus. In 183 BC Geminus was elected Pontifex Maximus, replacing Publius Licinius Crassus Dives.

References

Bibliography
 Friedrich Münzer: Servilius 60. In: Realencyclopädie der Classischen Altertumswissenschaft (RE). Band II A,2, Stuttgart 1923, Sp. 1792–1794.
 

180 BC deaths
3rd-century BC Roman consuls
3rd-century BC Roman praetors
2nd-century BC clergy
2nd-century BC Romans
Plebeian aediles
Magistri equitum (Roman Republic)
Pontifices
Pontifices maximi of the Roman Republic
Ancient Roman dictators
Roman governors of Sicily
Geminus, Gaius
Year of birth unknown